The 2016 Serbia Olympic basketball team represented Serbia and won the silver medal at the 2016 Summer Olympics in Rio de Janeiro, Brazil. They were qualified for the Summer Olympics by winning the FIBA World Olympic Qualifying Tournament in Belgrade. The team was coached by Aleksandar Đorđević, with assistant coaches Miroslav Nikolić, Milan Minić, and Jovica Antonić.

Timeline 
 May 20: 24-player preliminary roster announced
 June 16: 15-man roster announcement
 July 4–9: Olympic Qualifying Tournament
 July 15: Start of a training camp on Kopaonik mountain
 July 22: 12-man roster announcement
 July 23: The end of the training camp
 July 29–August 1: Exhibition games
 August 6–21: 2016 Summer Olympics

Roster 

The following were candidates to make the team:

Notes

Exhibition games 

The Serbia roster has participated at the Super 4 in Córdoba, Argentina (July 29 – August 1), together with Argentina, Croatia and France.
Super 4

Olympic play

Preliminary round

Venezuela

Australia

France

United States

China

Knockout round

Quarterfinal – Croatia
There was little to separate the two teams in the first half, with Serbia up 20-19 at the end of the opening period and Croatia taking a 38-32 advantage at the break. Serbia took control thanks to a third quarter in which they outscored Croatia 34-14. They took their biggest lead of the night, 66-52, when Bogdan Bogdanović buried a three-pointer with 22 seconds left in the period. Croatia answered by going on a 22-7 run that got them within 74-73 on Darko Planinić's pair of free-throws with 3:26 remaining. Serbia stayed in front but Croatia were breathing down their neck. Sasha Đorđević's side got a bit of breathing room when Miroslav Raduljica made the second of two foul shots to make it 79-75 with 27 seconds and that forced Croatia in having to foul intentionally to stop the clock but ultimately running out of time.

Semifinal – Australia
Serbia were in control of the game right from the start, scoring the opening eight points and forcing Australia into bad shots and costly turnovers. It didn't help that the Boomers were ice cold, going 2-of-15 from the field, as they trailed 16-5 by the end of the first quarter. It was more of the same in the second period as Australia continued to struggle to find the bottom of the net while Serbia tightened their grip on the game by closing out the first half on a 9-0 run for a commanding 35-14 lead. Australia broke out of their slump in the third quarter, scoring 24 points but Serbia had 31 of their own as they headed into the final frame up 66-38, with the win all but wrapped up. Miloš Teodosić was in attack mode right from the get go, scoring 6 of Serbia's first 12 points. It gave Serbia the start they needed and they never looked back. Teodosić finished with 22 points and 5 assists.

Gold medal game – United States

Statistics

See also 
 Serbia at the 2016 Summer Olympics
 2017 Serbia men's EuroBasket team

References

External links
Official website
Olympics tournament profile

2016 2
Serbia
2016–17 in Serbian basketball